Michael Patrick Shiels is a radio personality and author from the US state of Michigan. He is the host of Michigan's Big Show Starring Michael Patrick Shiels, heard on twelve Michigan radio stations. He is also known for authoring books with Donald Trump, Larry King, Arthur Hills, and Ben Wright.

Media career

Writing
Shiels has written for newspapers and magazines on golf and travel. His articles have appeared in publications including the Los Angeles Times, Cigar Aficionado, Travel + Leisure, AAA Michigan Living, Singapore's SC Magazine, Bermuda Royal Gazette, Honolulu Star-Bulletin, Automotive News, Traverse Magazine, Lake Magazine, Traverse City Record-Eagle, Booth Newspapers, The Detroit News, Detroit Free Press, Heritage Newspapers, Sports Illustrated, Golf Magazine, and more.

Radio
Shiels was the long-time producer for Detroit's legendary radio host, J.P. McCarthy at WJR. He began hosting the Michigan Talk Network's morning show in 2005 until his departure from WJIM and MTN in February 2012. Just over two months later, Shiels returned to radio as host of "Michigan's Big Show Starring Michael Patrick Shiels", a production of Spotlight Media Marketing and Productions, which is owned by former WJIM Account Executive Suzanne Huard.

Since 2012, "Michigan's Big Show Starring Michael Patrick Shiels" has continued to grow, and now airs on twelve radio station signals throughout the Lower Peninsula of Michigan. The program continues to make headlines with newsmaker interviews with Michigan politicians.

'MPS' won the "Network Radio Personality of the Year" award from the Michigan Association of Broadcasters in both 2007 and 2008.

Bibliography
Non-Fiction

External links
 Michigan's Big Show Starring Michael Patrick Shiels

References

American radio personalities
Living people
American travel writers
American male non-fiction writers
Golf writers and broadcasters
Sportswriters from Michigan
20th-century American non-fiction writers
Year of birth missing (living people)
20th-century American male writers
21st-century American non-fiction writers
21st-century American male writers
Writers from Michigan
Radio personalities from Michigan